Opheltes glaucopterus is a Ichneumonidae wasp that parasitizes pupae from the sawfly genus Cimbex.  It has a Holarctic distribution.

References

Parasitic wasps
Holarctic fauna
Taxa named by Carl Linnaeus
Wasps described in 1758